Matthias Rioux (born March 29, 1934) is a Canadian politician who represented the electoral district of Matane in the National Assembly of Quebec from 1994 to 2003 as a member of the Parti Québécois.

Electoral record

External links
 

1934 births
Canadian educators
Trade unionists from Quebec
Journalists from Quebec
Canadian radio personalities
Parti Québécois MNAs
Members of the Executive Council of Quebec
Living people
21st-century Canadian politicians